Florian Nicolas Lapis (born 8 August 1993) is a French professional footballer who plays as a left-back for  club FC Versailles 78.

Club career
Lapis started his career in the lower divisions of France, and joined Béziers in 2016. After helping Béziers get promoted into the Ligue 2 in 2018, Lapis transferred to Chamois Niortais on 12 June 2018. Lapis made his professional debut for Niort in a 2–1 Ligue 2 win over Red Star on 27 June 2018. At the end of his Niort contract, he signed a two-year deal with Orléans on 13 June 2020.

In June 2022, Lapis signed with Versailles.

International career
Lapis was called up to the Martinique national team for 2019–20 CONCACAF Nations League qualifying matches in March 2019.

References

External links
 
 
 FDB Profile
 Chamoius Niortais Profile

1993 births
Living people
Sportspeople from Saint-Denis, Seine-Saint-Denis
French footballers
French people of Martiniquais descent
Association football fullbacks
Chamois Niortais F.C. players
AS Béziers (2007) players
Paris FC players
US Orléans players
FC Versailles 78 players
Ligue 2 players
Championnat National players
Championnat National 3 players
Footballers from Seine-Saint-Denis